The Church of St. Emperor Constantine and Empress Helena is a church of the Serbian Orthodox Church, located in The Old Bazaar of Ivanjica.

History
The construction of the church started immediately after the town of Ivanjica was founded in 1833, following the liberation of the area from the Ottoman Empire in the Serbian Revolution. The construction works were funded by the locals and supervised by Miloš Obrenović. In 1836, the construction works were finished. The first restoration of the church was in the 1850s, and an artist from the time period, Dimitrije Posniković, painted it in 1862. Authentic iconostasis were saved and remain today.

Gallery

References

Serbian Orthodox church buildings in Serbia
19th-century Serbian Orthodox church buildings
Ivanjica